The Sioux City Breeze were a soccer club based in Sioux City, Iowa. The club began in the USISL and moved to the USISL Premier League in 1995.

Year-by-year

Defunct soccer clubs in Iowa
1994 establishments in Iowa
Defunct Premier Development League teams
1999 disestablishments in Iowa
Association football clubs established in 1994
Association football clubs disestablished in 1999
Sports in Sioux City, Iowa